Heavy Lifter is the third studio album by American alternative rock duo Hovvdy. It was released on October 18, 2019 under Double Double Whammy.

Singles
On August 7, 2019, Hovvdy announced the release of the new album, along with the first single "Cathedral". The second single "Ruin (my ride)" was released with a music video on September 5, 2019. On September 25, 2019, the third single, "So Brite" was released. "Mr Lee", the fourth single, was released on October 9, 2019.

Critical reception

Heavy Lifter was met with "universal acclaim" reviews from critics. At Metacritic, which assigns a weighted average rating out of 100 to reviews from mainstream publications, this release received an average score of 83, based on 7 reviews.

Track listing

Personnel

Musicians
 Charlie Martin – vocals, producer
 Will Taylor – vocals

Production
 Santiago Dietsche – photographer
 Edsel Holden – mastering
 Ben Littlejohn – mixer, producer

References

2019 albums
Double Double Whammy albums